CP Class 3100 and CP Class 3200 are two related series of railway multiple units with Iberian gauge, 2'2'+Bo'Bo'+2'2' wheel arrangement. They utilise a 1500 V direct current voltage system. They were first introduced in 1959 in the suburbs of Lisbon. The series was refurbished between 1998 and 2002. Since the renewal, this series has been known as the CP Class 3150 and CP Class 3250.

External links 
 
 
 

Electric multiple units of Portugal
1500 V DC multiple units